The 2023 George Mason Patriots men's volleyball team represents George Mason University in the 2023 NCAA Division I & II men's volleyball season. The Patriots, led by seventh year head coach Jay Hosack, play their home games at Recreation Athletic Complex. The Patriots are members of the Eastern Intercollegiate Volleyball Association and were picked to finish sixth in the EIVA preseason poll. 

Additionally George Mason enters the 2023 season with the knowledge that they will host the 2023 NCAA Men's Volleyball Tournament. Unlike the regular season, the tournament games will be played at EagleBank Arena so more fans can attend.

Roster

Schedule

 *-Indicates conference match.
 Times listed are Eastern Time Zone.

Broadcasters
Grand Canyon: Josh Yourish 
Ohio State: Jon Linney
LIU: Josh Yourish
Long Beach State: 
NJIT: 
Pepperdine: 
UCLA: 
Lewis: 
Purdue Fort Wayne: 
NJIT: 
King: 
Charleston (WV): 
Charleston (WV): 
North Greenville: 
Barton : 
Limestone: 
Limestone: 
Fairleigh Dickinson: 
Fairleigh Dickinson: 
Princeton: 
Loyola Chicago: 
Princeton: 
Penn State: 
Penn State: 
Harvard: 
Harvard:

Rankings 

^The Media did not release a Pre-season poll.

Honors
To be filled in upon completion of the season.

References

2023 in sports in Virginia
2023 NCAA Division I & II men's volleyball season
2023 team
George Mason